Visa requirements for Colombian citizens are administrative entry restrictions by the authorities of other states placed on citizens of Colombia.

As of November 9 2022, Colombian citizens had visa-free or visa on arrival access to 137 countries and territories ranking the Colombian passport 28th in terms of travel freedom according to passportindex.org.

Citizens of Colombia do not need a passport when travelling to Argentina, Bolivia, Brazil, Chile, Ecuador, Paraguay, Peru, and Uruguay. For these countries, they may use just their national identification cards.

Visa requirements map

Visa requirements
Visa requirements for holders of ordinary passports travelling for tourism purposes:

Colombia is an associated member of Mercosur. As such, its citizens enjoy unlimited access to any of the full members (Argentina, Brazil, Paraguay and Uruguay) and other associated members (Bolivia, Ecuador and Peru) with the right to residence and work, with no requirement other than nationality.  Citizens of these eight countries (including Colombia) may apply for the grant of "temporary residence" for up to two years in another country of the bloc. Then, they may apply for "permanent residence" just before the term of their "temporary residence" expires. The case of Chile, however, is different. The Chile's immigration policy does not include Colombian citizens in the agreement, thus Colombians need to hold a visa prior to travel if they want to reside and work in Chile.

Unrecognized or partially recognized countries

Dependent and autonomous territories

Non-visa restrictions

See also

 Visa policy of Colombia
 Colombian passport

References

Notes

Colombia
Foreign relations of Colombia